Highcrest Academy, formerly known as Highcrest Community School and before that as Hatters Lane School, is situated on Hatters Lane Hill in High Wycombe, Buckinghamshire. It is currently led by the Headteacher Mr G Burke after Miss Sheena Moynihan turned the school around from being on the edge of closure. In November 2010 it was judged to be an 'outstanding' school by Ofsted. In July 2011 the school became an Academy and was renamed to reflect its new status.

It is a mixed secondary school, which takes children from the age of 11 through to the age of 18.

In September 2006 the school was designated by the Department for Education and Skills (DfES) as a specialist school in Technology.

Highcrest Community School is one of several Buckinghamshire schools which host mobile phone masts. Contracts between Buckinghamshire County Council and various mobile phone operators generate an income of £145,000 per annum, of which about £59,000 comes from contracts for masts that are installed in schools.

There are 1,090 pupils at Highcrest Community School: 190 in each of years 7, 8, and 10; 160 in year 9; and 100 in each of years 11, 12 and 13. The school has 55 teachers and 35 support staff.

References

External links
Department for Education Performance Tables 2011

Secondary schools in Buckinghamshire
High Wycombe
Academies in Buckinghamshire
Educational institutions established in 2001
2001 establishments in England